In Greek mythology, Mendeis (Ancient Greek: Μενδέις) was a Thracian nymph who became the mother of Pallene by King Sithon. Her husband had the habit of killing one by one the suitors of her daughter. In some accounts, Pallene's mother was called Anchiroe instead.

Notes

References 

 Conon, Fifty Narrations, surviving as one-paragraph summaries in the Bibliotheca (Library) of Photius, Patriarch of Constantinople translated from the Greek by Brady Kiesling. Online version at the Topos Text Project.

Nymphs
Mythological Thracian women
Thracian characters in Greek mythology
Greek mythology of Thrace